The Last of the Duanes is a 1930 American pre-Code Western film produced and released by Fox Film Corporation, directed by Alfred L. Werker, and starring George O'Brien, Lucile Browne and Myrna Loy.

The film is based on Zane Grey's 1914 novel, Last of the Duanes. It is a remake of Fox's successful 1919 silent starring William Farnum and their 1924 silent remake starring Tom Mix. The novel was also adapted in 1941 starring George Montgomery.

Cast
 George O'Brien as Buck Duane
 Lucile Browne as Ruth Garrett
 Myrna Loy as Lola
 Walter McGrail as Bland
 Clara Blandick as Mrs. Duane
 Frank Campeau as Luke Stevens
 Natalie Kingston as Morgan's girlfriend
 Jim Mason as Jim Morgan
 James Bradbury Jr. as Euchre
 Lloyd Ingraham as Mr. Garrett
 Willard Robertson as Texas Ranger Captain

Soundtrack 
 "Cowboy Dan" (Written by Cliff Friend)
 "The Outlaw Song" (Written by Cliff Friend)

References

External links 
 

1930 films
1930 Western (genre) films
American Western (genre) films
American black-and-white films
Remakes of American films
1930s English-language films
Films based on American novels
Films based on Western (genre) novels
Films based on works by Zane Grey
Films scored by Samuel Kaylin
Fox Film films
Sound film remakes of silent films
1930s American films